Kantor is a surname. Notable people with the surname include:

 Adam Kantor, American actor and singer
 Gergely Kántor (born 1999), Hungarian chess grandmaster
 Isaiah Kantor (or Issai Kantor), mathematician
 Istvan Kantor, Hungarian-born Canadian performance artist
 Jodi Kantor, New York Times journalist
 Loli Kantor (born 1952), French-born Israeli-American photographer
 MacKinlay Kantor, American novelist and screenwriter
 Maxim Kantor, Russian painter and writer
 Mickey Kantor, American lawyer and politician
 Piotr Kantor, Polish volleyball player
 Roman Kantor (1912–1943), Polish épée fencer killed by the Nazis
 Seligmann Kantor (1857–1903), Bohemian mathematician
 Tadeusz Kantor, Polish painter and theatre director
 Viatcheslav Moshe Kantor, Russian businessman, philanthropist and Jewish leader
 William Kantor (born 1944), American mathematician

See also 
 Cantor (surname)
 Kantorov (surname)
 Kanter, surname

Jewish surnames